Kabete Constituency is one of twelve electoral constituencies within Kiambu County that neighbours Westlands Constituency in Nairobi County, Kenya. The constituency has a population of 140,427 and occupies an approximate area of 60.20 km2. 

A study in 2005 revealed that Kabete constituency had the lowest poverty rate in Kenya.
 
In 2012 Kikuyu Constituency, previously part of Kabete constituency, was split off following the growth of population within the area.

George Muchai, member of parliament for Kabete Constituency and Deputy Secretary General of the Central Organization of Trade Unions, was shot dead by unknown assailants in Nairobi on February 7, 2015. According to the Standard Newspaper for 10 November 2014, Muchai had alleged that there was rampant embezzlement, misappropriation and mismanagement of workers' deductions which translated into Sh190 billion. 

He was succeeded by Ferdinand Waititu who was sworn in on 26 May 2015 during a special parliamentary sitting after winning the election in a landslide victory, winning over 90% of the total votes cast. Waititu is a former Member of Parliament for Embakasi Constituency. After being declared the winner he promised to offer good leadership and indicated that during the next elections he would be a candidate for the post of governor in Kiambu County.

Kabete constituency has five county assembly wards as indicated below:

References

 
 Kabete constituency at softkenya.com

Constituencies in Central Province (Kenya)
Constituencies in Kiambu County